The Weeping of a Thousand Years is the second full-length album by Deinonychus. It was released in July 1996 on Cacophonous Records.

Track list 
 The Romantic Sounds of Death - 06:32	
 A Gathering of Memories - 07:10	
 Upon the Highlands I Fought - 07:20	
 A Last Lament - 07:11	
 I Have Done as You Did - 07:09	
 Lost Forever - 07:11	
 The Awakened - 12:33	
 The Gothic Statue - 08:22

References 

1996 albums
Deinonychus (band) albums
Cacophonous Records albums